Lawrence Legend (born Lawrence Ryan, 28 March 1971 in Junee, New South Wales) is an Australian stunt motorcyclist. Legend obtained his first motorcycle when aged 14 and has since gone on to become a notable stunt performer and world record holder.

He has cowritten with Michelene Ryan a children's book titled The Adventures of Lawrence Legend about two school classmates waiting for the arrival of Legend to their school.

References

External links
Official website

Australian children's writers
Australian stunt performers
Australian television personalities
Living people
1971 births
People from Junee
Motorcycle stunt performers